WFNX may refer to:

 WFNX (FM), a radio station (95.3 FM) in Grand Marais, Minnesota, United States
 WKMY (FM), a radio station (99.9 FM) in Athol, Massachusetts that held the call sign WFNX from 2013 to 2020
 WBWL (FM), a radio station (101.7 FM) in Boston, Massachusetts, which held the call sign WFNX from 1983 to 2012